The Temple of Apollo Patroos (meaning "from the fathers") is a small ruined temple of Ionic order built in 340–320 BCE. It is 10 m wide and 16.5 m long, and is located north-west of the Ancient Agora of Athens, near the Stoa of Zeus.

Apollo was considered to be the founder of the Ionian race and protector of families.  The temple's interior had a cult statue dedicated to the god and made by the famous Greek sculptor Euphranor.

Pausanias described the temple in the second century: 
Euphranor also wrought the Apollon surnamed Patroios (Paternal) in the temple hard by [the Painted Portico oin the marketplace of Athens]. And in front of the temple is one Apollon made by Leokhares; the other Apollo, called Alexikakos (Averter of evil), was made by Kalamis. They say that the god received this name because by an oracle from Delphoi he stayed the pestilence which afflicted the Athenians at the time of the Peloponnesian War.
If still in use by the 4th-century, the temple would have been closed during the persecution of pagans in the late Roman Empire, when the  Christian Emperors issued edicts prohibiting all non-Christian worship and sanctuaries.

See also
 Ancient Greek temple
 List of Ancient Greek temples

References

Landmarks in Athens
Ancient Greek buildings and structures in Athens
Apollo Patroos
Patroos
Ionian mythology
4th-century BC religious buildings and structures
Ruins in Greece
Ancient Agora of Athens